Deh Now-ye Khaleseh (also Romanized as Deh Now-ye Khāleşeh, Deh Now-e Khāleşeh, and Deh Now Khāleşeh; also known as Deh-i-Nau, Deh Nau, Deh Now, and Deh Now-ye Kenār Gūsheh) is a village in Mazul Rural District, in the Central District of Nishapur County, Razavi Khorasan Province, Iran. At the 2006 census, its population was 2,519, in 657 families.

References 

Populated places in Nishapur County